William H. Hampton (1893 – February 27, 1957) was an American lawyer and politician from New York.

Life
He was born in 1893 in Scotland, the son of Edward Mackie Hampton (1862–1934) and Agnes (Hately) Hampton (1866–1961). He graduated from Gouverneur High School, in Gouverneur, New York, in 1913; and from Syracuse University College of Law in 1916. During World War I, he served with the 301st Engineers of the U.S. Army, and finished the war as a lieutenant.

After the war, he practiced law in Utica, and was a Justice of the Peace. On September 4, 1923, he married Esther Kolpien, and they had two sons. He was a U.S. Commissioner for the Northern District of New York from 1927 to 1934.

Hampton was a member of the New York State Senate (36th D.) from 1935 to 1944, sitting in the 158th, 159th, 160th, 161st, 162nd, 163rd and 164th New York State Legislatures.

He died on February 27, 1957, in Faxton Hospital in Utica, New York, after a heart attack.

Sources

1893 births
1957 deaths
Republican Party New York (state) state senators
Politicians from Utica, New York
Syracuse University College of Law alumni
British emigrants to the United States
United States magistrate judges
United States Army officers
People from Gouverneur, New York
20th-century American politicians
20th-century American judges